Nisa Romyen ( born 18 January 1990) is a Thai international footballer who plays as a forward.

International goals

References

External links 
 
 

Living people
Women's association football forwards
Nisa Romyen
2015 FIFA Women's World Cup players
Footballers at the 2010 Asian Games
Footballers at the 2014 Asian Games
1990 births
Nisa Romyen
Nisa Romyen
Nisa Romyen
Nisa Romyen
Southeast Asian Games medalists in football
Competitors at the 2007 Southeast Asian Games
Competitors at the 2017 Southeast Asian Games
Nisa Romyen
Nisa Romyen